The 1980–81 season was Galatasaray's 77th in existence and the 23rd consecutive season in the Turkish First Football League. This article shows statistics of the club's players in the season, and also lists all matches that the club have played in the season.

Squad statistics

2nd leg Galatasaray SK – Bursa SK squad has not been added

Players in / out

In

Out

1. Lig

Standings

Matches
Kick-off listed in local time (EET)

Turkiye Kupasi

Kick-off listed in local time (EET)

5th Round

6th Round

Quarter-final

Friendly Matches
Kick-off listed in local time (EET)

TSYD Kupası

Attendance

References

 Tuncay, Bülent (2002). Galatasaray Tarihi. Yapı Kredi Yayınları

External links
 Galatasaray Sports Club Official Website 
 Turkish Football Federation – Galatasaray A.Ş. 
 uefa.com – Galatasaray AŞ

Galatasaray S.K. (football) seasons
Turkish football clubs 1980–81 season
1980s in Istanbul